The epithet "the Rich" may refer to:

 Adalbert II, Margrave of Tuscany (c. 875–915)
 Guntram the Rich (c. 920–973), a count in Breisgau (now Germany), possible progenitor of the House of Habsburg
 Kjotve the Rich, late 9th century king of Agder, a petty kingdom in southern Norway
 Louis IX, Duke of Bavaria (1417–1479)
 Mary of Burgundy (1457–1482), Duchess regnant of Burgundy, first wife of Maximilian I, later Holy Roman Emperor
 Otto, Count of Ballenstedt (died 1123), the first Ascanian prince to call himself Count of Anhalt, briefly named Duke of Saxony
 Otto II, Margrave of Meissen (1125–1190)
 William I, Count of Nassau-Siegen (1487–1559)
 William, Duke of Jülich-Cleves-Berg (1516–1592), brother of Anne of Cleves, briefly Queen of England
 William Jennens (1701–1798), "the richest commoner in England"

See also
 Abraham the Poor (died 372), Egyptian hermit and saint
 List of people known as the Miser

Lists of people by epithet